4α-Methylfecosterol is a metabolic intermediate of sterols made by certain fungis, can be converted to 24-Methylenelophenol by enzyme HYD1, or undergo 4-demethylation to fecosterol.

References

Sterols